The East Midlands Electricity Board (EMEB) was formed in 1947 as one of the United Kingdom's twelve area electricity boards specified under the Electricity Act 1947. In 1990 it was floated on the stock market as East Midlands Electricity plc, which went through several changes of ownership.

Supply area

The board covered a large area: from Chesterfield in Derbyshire, to Newport Pagnell (near modern-day Milton Keynes), in Buckinghamshire, and from Coventry in the west to Skegness in the east.

Structure
The organisation's headquarters were at Mapperley Hall in Mapperley Park, Nottingham in the 1960s, then on Coppice Road in Arnold, a suburb of the city.

The board was responsible for the purchase of electricity from the electricity generator (the Central Electricity Generating Board from 1958) and its distribution and sale of electricity to customers.

The key people on the board were: Chairman A.N. Todd (1964) A. H. Kenyon (1967), Deputy Chairman A. H. Kenyon (1964) P. Sydney (1967), full-time members J. A. MacKerrell (1964, 1967) R. A. York (1967).

History
The board was required to supply electricity to homes and businesses, as regulated by the Act, and under terms of reference from the Electricity Council and the CEGB. In many towns, the board opened showrooms, to provide customer service facilities such as paying bills, as well as demonstrating and supplying the latest electrical goods to customers. The total number of customers supplied by the Board was:

The post-war period was one of fast growth for the electricity industry. The pre-war National Grid system was vastly expanded, and many new power stations were opened across the region. One major customer was British Rail: when the West Coast Main Line was electrified in the 1960s, and the East Coast Main Line in the 1980s, the electricity boards were required to supply the lines passing through their territory with electricity direct from the National Grid. The amount of electricity, in GWh, sold by East Midlands Electricity Board was:

Privatisation

In 1987, the Conservatives’ election manifesto committed the party to further privatisation of nationalised industries, and the electricity industry was to be one of these. In March 1990, the board became East Midlands Electricity plc, a new regional electricity company. In December 1990 it floated on the stock market. Although operations continued as usual for a few years, the business began to be separated and broken up. The electricity showroom and sales business merged with those of other companies into the Powerhouse chain, in 1994/5. In November 1995, the company split into three divisions of distribution, metering and supply. The company was bought by Dominion Resources for £1.3bn in December 1996. In September 1998, EME's distribution and supply business was bought by Powergen for £1.9bn, ensuring the business remained vertically integrated. The EME brand was not replaced until 1999, although the distribution business continued under the EME brand until it merged with Central Networks in 2004.

See also
E.ON UK (formerly Powergen)
Public electricity supplier

References

External links 
 Former headquarters on Coppice Road

British companies established in 1990
Companies based in Nottinghamshire
East Midlands
Former nationalised industries of the United Kingdom
Gedling
Organizations established in 1947
Electric power companies of the United Kingdom
1947 establishments in England